Egon Köhnen (born 24 November 1947) is a retired German footballer.

He played for Fortuna Düsseldorf between 1966 and 1981, playing 272 Bundesliga games and scoring 12 goals. He helped the team winning the DFB-Pokal in 1978–79 and 1979–80.

References

External links
 

1947 births
Living people
German footballers
Fortuna Düsseldorf players
Bundesliga players
2. Bundesliga players
Association football defenders
People from Erkelenz
Sportspeople from Cologne (region)
Footballers from North Rhine-Westphalia
West German footballers
KFC Uerdingen 05 players